Brugg or Brügg may refer to the following places:

Switzerland
 Brugg, Aargau
 FC Brugg, a football club
 Brugg District
 Brugg AG railway station
 Brügg, Bern
 Brügg BE railway station

Germany
 Brugg, Meckenbeuren, Baden-Württemberg 
 Brugg, Gestratz, Bavaria

See also 

 Bruck (disambiguation)
 van der Brugge
 Van Bruggen
 Brüggen (disambiguation)
 Bruckner (disambiguation)
 Bruges (disambiguation)